Wang Phang is a tambon (subdistrict) of Wiang Nong Long District, in Lamphun Province, Thailand. In 2015 it had a population of 8,051 people.

Administration

Central administration
The tambon is subdivided into 11 administrative villages (mubans).

Local administration
The whole area of the subdistrict is covered by the subdistrict municipality (thesaban tambon) Wang Phang (เทศบาลตำบลวังผาง).

References

External links
Thaitambon.com on Wang Phang

Tambon of Lamphun province
Populated places in Lamphun province